Goodnestone  may refer to:

Goodnestone, Dover
Goodnestone, Swale 
Goodnestone, a volume of poems published by Andrew Motion